Abolition of Penal Sanctions (Indigenous Workers) Convention, 1955 (shelved) is  an International Labour Organization Convention.

It was established in 1955, with the preamble stating:
Having decided upon the adoption of certain proposals with regard to penal sanctions for breaches of contract of employment by indigenous workers.

Ratifications
Prior to its shelving, the convention was ratified by 26 states.

References

External links 

Text.
Ratifications.

Shelved International Labour Organization conventions
Treaties concluded in 1955
Treaties entered into force in 1958